Kuhrud may refer to:
 Kuhrud, Gilan
 Kuhrud, Isfahan